Fernanda Neves Beling (born 5 December 1982) is a Brazilian basketball player who competed in the 2008 Summer Olympics.

References

1982 births
Living people
Brazilian women's basketball players
Olympic basketball players of Brazil
Basketball players at the 2008 Summer Olympics